Mimovitalisia wittmeri is a species of beetle in the family Cerambycidae. It was described by Breuning in 1975. It is known from Bhutan.

References

Desmiphorini
Beetles described in 1975